SappyFest is an annual independent arts and music festival held in Sackville, New Brunswick, Canada. Started by Paul Henderson, Jon Claytor, and musician Julie Doiron as an extension of Sappy Records, the festival launched 2006.

The festival is produced by Sappy Records in partnership with OK.Quoi?! Contemporary Arts Festival, Struts Gallery, and the Faucet Media Arts Centre. SappyFest draws musicians and audience members alike from across the continent.  Many Sackville residents volunteer their time to SappyFest, either by billeting visitors, working security, taking tickets, or taking on a slew of other tasks. Steven Lambke served as Creative Director of Sappyfest, from 2017 to 2021. Andrea Vincent is the current Creative Director of Sappyfest, succeeding Steve Lambke in February 2022.

By year

2007
Headliners included Julie Doiron, Constantines, Chad VanGaalen, and Eric's Trip from August 3–5, 2007.

2008
SappyFest '08 occurred on Friday 1 August 2008 – Sunday 3 August 2008. Headliners included Julie Doiron, Chad VanGaalen, The Acorn, and Miracle Fortress.

2009
Headliners included Eric's Trip, Wintersleep, Destroyer, Timber Timbre, Ohbijou, The Burning Hell, and Old Man Luedecke.

2010
The festival took place from July 30 to August 1. Performers included Attack in Black, The Sadies, Chad VanGaalen, Jim Guthrie, Old Man Luedecke, The Felice Brothers, Holy Fuck, and Gentleman Reg. On Sunday, Halifax band Sloan performed unannounced at the mainstage tent. The setlist included their album Twice Removed in its entirety, a first for the band.

2011
The lineup for the Sappyfest in 2011 included Rich Aucoin, Grimes, Chad Vangaalen, Charles Bradley, and a surprise show from Arcade Fire, performing under the decoy name Shark Attack.

2012
Headliners included Metz, Fucked up, and Thee Silver Mount Zion Memorial Orchestra and Tra La La Band

2013 
In 2013, the festival ran a conference on presenting small music festivals in rural contexts, called "Why Nowhere?". The music line-up that year included the Joel Plaskett Emergency, Chad VanGaalen, Shotgun Jimmie, The Underachievers, Colin Stetson, Naomi Shelton & the Gospel Queens, and Pictish Trail.

2014
Taking place on the first weekend of August, the 2014 lineup included Ought, Basia Bulat, The Constantines, as well as Shotgun & Jaybird.

2015
SappyFest X was temporarily relocated to York Street due to a major reconstruction of its usual home on Bridge Street. Performers included Angel Olsen, PUP, Shotgun Jimmie, and Jennifer Castle

2016
Returning to the familiar setting of Bridge Street, the 2016 lineup included Cakes Da Killa, TUNS, Julie Doiron and the Wooden Stars, Dilly Dally, Nap Eyes, Century Egg, Partner, and Ought.

2017 
The 2017 lineup included Lido Pimienta, Weaves, Partner, Daniel Romano, and Willie Thrasher.

2018
The 2018 lineup included U.S. Girls, Jeremy Dutcher, Jennifer Castle, Leanne Betasamosake Simpson, Nap Eyes, and Bonjay

2019
SappyFest 14 was held August 2–4, 2019. This years lineup included: Alumette, Aquakulture, Apollo Ghosts, Barnacle, Cruising & Searing, Deliluh, Dimaondtown, Fet.Nat, Flour, Gianna Lauren, Haviah Mighty, Janowskii, José Conteras, Joyfultalk, Juice Girls, Julie Aubé, Julie Doiron, Lal, Lillia, Liz Brain X Doug, Lo Siento, Mauno, Motherhood, Nyssa, Positive Body Language, Papal Visit, Shotgun Jimmie, Snotty Nose Rez Kids, Tim Baker, Tryal,  The Weather Station, Whoop-Szo, and Yves Jarvis.

2020
For SappyFest 15, due to the Coronavirus pandemic, a scheduled livestream was held instead of in-person live performances. Titled "SappyFest: Near And Far", it was held on July 29 - Aug 1, 2020. The 2020 lineup included: Ariel Sharratt and Mathias Kom, Bart Vautour, Colleen Collins, Emma Healey, Egyptian Cotton Arkestra, Geordie Miller, Hélène Barbier, Jennah Barry, Jon Mckiel, Julie Doiron, Kate Miller, Kawama Kasutu, Klarkam Weinwurm, Kwento, Lavender Bruises, Laura Watson, Marilyn Lerch, Lido Pimienta, Patrick Allaby, Rachel Thornton, Rebecca Roher, Steven Lambke, Leanne Betasamosake Simpson, Sue Goyette, USSE, and Wares.

2021
SappyFest 16, due to the Covid-19 Pandemic, scheduled a livestream performance titled "SappyFest: Infinite Variety", instead of in-person performances, and broadcast live from Struts Gallery, on July 30–31, 2021. The 2021 lineup included Amy Siegel, Ariel Sharratt & Mathias Kom, Erin Bardua, Black Dimes, Brandon Hicks, Brian Neilson, Bucky Buckler, Caged Animals, Century Egg, Chris Meaney, Cluttered, Elm & Ampersand, G.L.A.M. Bats, Marilyn Lerch & Geordie Miller, Izzy Francolini & Desdemona Shaw, Jerry Ropson, Jeska Grue, John Kilpatrick, Jon McKiel, Julie Doiron, Klarka Weinwurm, Laura Watson, Lucy Koshan, Marissa Sean Cruz, Olivia McNair,  Phil Mercier, Rachel M Thornton, Rebecca Blankert, Sarah Wendt & Pascal Dufaux, Theo Crocker, Wandarian, Tori Weldon and Wolf Castle.

2022
SappyFest 17 is scheduled to take place during July 29–31, 2022. The festival is currently looking for submissions.

References
Citations

Weston, Greg. Times and Transcript. Early tourism numbers promising; Season shows early signs of growth as NBers stay close to home. (Moncton) Wed Jun 17, 2009. Page: A9

External links
SappyFest Official site
Sappy Records Official site
Struts Gallery
OK, Quoi!?
On Last.FM
On Flickr
On YouTube

Rock festivals in Canada
Music festivals in New Brunswick
Music festivals established in 2006
Tourist attractions in Westmorland County, New Brunswick
2006 establishments in New Brunswick
Sackville, New Brunswick